WDYK is an adult contemporary formatted broadcast radio station licensed to Ridgeley, West Virginia, serving the Cumberland/Frostburg/Keyser area.  WDYK is owned and operated by West Virginia Radio Corporation.

History
WDYK went on the air in September 2006 with an Adult Contemporary format.  The station was West Virginia Radio Corporation's entrance into the Cumberland market.  The company later bought WQZK and WKLP.  WDYK airs the syndicated John Tesh show weeknights.  WDYK airs the Bob and Sheri Program in the morning from 6AM to 9AM.

In February 2009, WDYK began broadcasting in HD.

External links
Magic 100.5 Online

DYK
DYK
Mainstream adult contemporary radio stations in the United States